Aggressive may refer to:

 Aggressive-class minesweeper, a class of minesweepers built for and used by the United States Navy
 USS Aggressive (MSO-422), an American minesweeper of the Aggressive class
 Aggressive (film director), a New York-based music video directing team of Alex Topaller and Daniel Shapiro
 Aggressive mood, a grammatical mood-like verb construction unique to the Finnish language
 Aggressive (album), a 2016 album by Beartooth

See also
 Aggression (disambiguation)
 Aggressor (disambiguation)